Gilles Müller was the defending champion, but he did not participate. Alexander Sarkissian won the title over Connor Smith.

Seeds

Draw

Finals

Top half

Bottom half

External links
 Main Draw
 Qualifying Draw

Gimcheon Open ATP Challenger - Singles
2015 Singles